Zapadni Cesko-Bratrska Jednota or Západní Česko-Bratrská Jednota, also known as ZCBJ or ZČBJ, was a Czech-language newspaper in the United States.  It was founded and published by Jan Rosický (1845–1910).

See also
Czech-Slovak Protective Society

References

Western Fraternal Life Association
Czech-language newspapers published in the United States